Zarah Garde-Wilson (born 1978) is an Australian solicitor in Victoria who rose to prominence after she acted for many persons under investigation by Victoria Police in relation to the Melbourne gangland killings of 1998–2006. 

In 2005, Garde-Wilson was found guilty of Contempt of court after refusing to testify in the trial of two men charged with the murder of her boyfriend Lewis Caine claiming that she feared for her life.

Garde-Wilson was thought to have provided the 2006 tip off to Tony Mokbel that caused him to skip bail and head to Greece. In 2016 she filed an affidavit stating "that 'Lawyer X's' identity was common knowledge within the legal fraternity and that she was aware of 'Lawyer X's' true identity."

In March 2021, Garde-Wilson lost a court case requesting that Google provide her with additional information about who was behind a negative online review so that she could sue them for defamation.

Personal life
Garde-Wilson was the girlfriend of Lewis Caine, a victim of homicide by firearm in 2004 of the Melbourne gangland killings.

She gave birth to a daughter, Samantha in late 2008. In September 2010 she gave birth to twins, Max and Sophie with her husband and father of her children, Lance Simon.

In popular culture
 Garde-Wilson was portrayed by Kestie Morassi in the 2008 television series Underbelly.
 Garde-Wilson was portrayed by Zoe Cramond in the 2014 Australian television series Fat Tony & Co.

References

External links
 Garde Wilson Lawyers
 "Informer's expulsion from witness protection upheld" by Steve Butcher, The Age, 17 March 2007

1978 births
Living people
Australian solicitors
Melbourne gangland killings
Lawyers from Melbourne